Pullman–Moscow Regional Airport  is a public airport in the northwest United States, located in Whitman County, Washington,  east of Pullman, Washington and  west of Moscow, Idaho. The airport is accessed via spurs from State Route 270, and has a single  runway, headed northeast–southwest (5/23), which entered service in October 2019.

The rural airport in the Palouse region is the primary air link for its two land-grant universities, Washington State University in Pullman and the University of Idaho in Moscow. In addition to scheduled service from Alaska Airlines (through its Horizon Air subsidary), both universities use the airport for jet charters for their intercollegiate athletic teams.

The Federal Aviation Administration (FAA) National Plan of Integrated Airport Systems for 2017–2021 categorized the airport as a non-hub primary commercial service facility.

History 

Aviation at the site began in the 1920s as a grass strip, which was later improved by the Civilian Conservation Corps (CCC) and Works Progress Administration (WPA); the runway was first paved in 1946.

Horizon Air (marketed and sold as Alaska Airlines) is the sole commercial airline serving the airport, flying Bombardier Q400 turboprop aircraft. It began limited service to Pullman–Moscow  in December 1981 with Fairchild F-27 aircraft (Friday  and daily service (along with Lewiston) in March 1983, on F-27 and Metroliner aircraft.
Service to Portland, Spokane, and Boise was ended in 1997. Horizon now offers 4-5 daily scheduled flights to Seattle–Tacoma. Historically, flight schedules had sometimes included a stop at Lewiston, but currently all scheduled flights to Seattle are non-stop. Flights to Boise returned August 2021, five times a week.

Prior to Horizon, Cascade Airways (1969–1986) was the main carrier at the airport, starting Palouse service in late 1971. United Express operated at Pullman–Moscow for over two years, from May 1988 to September 1990.

Facilities and aircraft 

It has one asphalt paved runway designated 5/23, which measures .
The airport was annexed by the City of Pullman in August 1988, and the present terminal opened in February 1990 at a cost of $2.7 million, with a formal dedication and airshow in May. A new and significantly larger terminal is expected in the early 2020s.

The modest commercial terminal is a single large room, divided between pre- and post-security areas by a single security checkpoint and glass walls. The waiting area occupies all space beyond the checkpoint but is not commonly used for waiting, as most passengers pass through the security checkpoint immediately before boarding. Both passenger gates are ground-level doors to the tarmac; passengers board via the fold-down aircraft-door stairs, or airstairs (for larger charter aircraft). Gate 1 on the east side of the terminal is used by Horizon Air.

The public airport shares the runway with a fixed-base operator, Interstate Aviation, which conducts chartered air service and flight school. Local engineering firm Schweitzer Engineering Laboratories, Inc. owns and operates private hangars at the airport.

For the 12-month period ending January 1, 2014, the airport had 29,350 aircraft operations, an average of 80 per day: 85% general aviation, 14% scheduled commercial, 1% air taxi, and <1% military. Occasionally, the airport has accepted Boeing 737 aircraft on Alaska Airlines charter flights.

In January 2018, there were 71 aircraft based at this airport: 60 single-engine, 7 multi-engine, 3 jet, and 1 glider.

Airline and destinations

Top destinations

Accidents and incidents 
A cargo flight from Spokane to Lewiston, it had diverted to Pullman due to a weather closure at Lewiston.

References

External links 

 

 Pullman–Moscow Regional Airport – WSDOT Aviation
 

Airports in Washington (state)
Transportation buildings and structures in Whitman County, Washington
Tourist attractions in Whitman County, Washington
Airports established in 1940
1940 establishments in Washington (state)